Elton Charles Figueiredo da Silva (born 12 February 1986), commonly known as Elton Figueiredo, is a Brazilian footballer who plays as a midfielder for C.R.D. Libolo.

External links

Elton Figueiredo at playmakerstats.com (English version of ogol.com.br and zerozero.pt)

1986 births
Living people
People from Cuiabá
Brazilian footballers
Brazilian expatriate footballers
Association football midfielders
Esporte Clube Vitória players
Joinville Esporte Clube players
Comercial Futebol Clube (Ribeirão Preto) players
Santa Cruz Futebol Clube players
FC Dinamo București players
Apollon Limassol FC players
Xanthi F.C. players
Atlético Clube Goianiense players
Luverdense Esporte Clube players
Club Sportivo Sergipe players
C.R.D. Libolo players
Campeonato Brasileiro Série B players
Campeonato Brasileiro Série C players
Campeonato Brasileiro Série D players
Girabola players
Liga I players
Cypriot First Division players
Brazilian expatriate sportspeople in Romania
Brazilian expatriate sportspeople in Cyprus
Brazilian expatriate sportspeople in Greece
Brazilian expatriate sportspeople in Angola
Expatriate footballers in Romania
Expatriate footballers in Cyprus
Expatriate footballers in Greece
Expatriate footballers in Angola
Sportspeople from Mato Grosso